Roger Niello (born 2 June 1948, in San Francisco, CA) is a Republican who served in the California State Assembly from 2004 to 2010. He represented California's 5th Assembly District, which includes the Sacramento County suburbs and towns of Arden-Arcade, Carmichael, Citrus Heights, Fair Oaks, Folsom, North Highlands, McClellan Park, Orangevale, Natomas, Sacramento and the Placer County town of Granite Bay.

Background and education

Born in San Francisco, Assemblyman Roger Niello has lived in Sacramento nearly all of his life. After graduating from Sacramento's Encina High School, Niello attended the University of California at Berkeley for his undergraduate studies, then completed his graduate studies at the University of California at Los Angeles.

Niello worked as a Certified Public Accountant until he joined his family's business at Niello Auto Group in 1974 and spent the next 25 years running retail automobile dealerships with his family partners.
In 1995, Niello served as the President of the Sacramento Metropolitan Chamber of Commerce, and was a member of the Capital Area Political Action Committee. As a member of the community, he was an active volunteer.

Niello was elected to the Sacramento County Board of Supervisors in a special election in February 1999. As a member of the Board of Supervisors, he served Sacramento County on numerous boards and commissions.  
 
In 2004, Niello was elected to the California State Assembly and was immediately appointed Vice Chair of the Assembly Banking and Finance Committee and also served in positions on the Assembly Budget, and Transportation Committees. In addition, he served for a brief time on the Assembly Public Employees, Retirement and Social Security Committee and the Joint Legislative Audit Committee. In late 2006, Niello was named vice-chair of the Assembly Budget Committee, and serves as the key negotiator on budget issues for the Assembly Republican Caucus.

Since being reelected to a third and final term in the Assembly, Niello continues to serve on the Budget, Transportation, Insurance, and Business and Professions Committees as well as the Joint Committee on Emergency Services and Homeland Security and the Select Committee on Foster Care.

Legislation
Among Assemblyman Niello's legislative accomplishments include legislation to allow individuals to remove racially charged language from a homeowner's CC&Rs, a measure to assist local governments in cracking down on illegal dumping, and a bill to ban the unscrupulous practice of "triple-dipping" by county retired annuitants who are collecting unemployment in addition to retirement pension benefits. In addition, Assemblyman Niello's legislation to authorize the state to participate in Public Private Partnerships for infrastructure projects provided a template for the language in the most recent budget agreement.

Additionally, Assemblyman Niello has introduced legislation to bring about innovative reforms to a method of contracting public infrastructure, as well as measures intended to alleviate the burden of unfunded mandates the state places on local government. Other notable legislative efforts include an overhaul of the state's unclaimed property program, which would return unclaimed property to its rightful owners in a timely manner and provide interest payments on property held by the state, as well as legislation transferring the responsibility for writing initiative ballot titles from the partisan Attorney General's office to the non-partisan Legislative Analyst's Office.

Assemblyman Niello represented the 5th district in the California State Assembly, which includes the Sacramento County communities of Arden Arcade, Carmichael, the City of Citrus Heights, Fair Oaks, the City of Folsom, North Highlands, McClellan Park, Orangevale, Natomas, Sacramento and the Placer County community of Granite Bay.

External links
 Official website
 Official Assembly website
Join California Roger Niello

1948 births
Living people
Politicians from Sacramento, California
Republican Party members of the California State Assembly
University of California, Berkeley alumni
University of California, Los Angeles alumni
21st-century American politicians